Treasure EP.Fin: All to Action is the first studio album by South Korean boy band Ateez. It was released through KQ Entertainment on October 8, 2019, alongside the single "Wonderland" and its music video. It also serves as the final part of the Treasure series. The album debuted atop the Gaon Album Chart.

Background and writing
The album was produced by Eden, who has produced much of the band's material. He also co-wrote most of the tracks with Buddy, Leez and Ollounder, the latter two of whom contributed to Treasure EP.3: One to All. Band members and rappers Hongjoong and Mingi co-wrote "Wonderland", with Hongjoong also partaking in the composition of "Sunrise". The song "Thank U" was also written by Hongjoong to express his gratitude towards fellow member Seonghwa.

Track listing

Charts

Accolades

References

2019 albums
Ateez albums
Korean-language albums